Dildarnagar Junction railway station is a railway station in Dildarnagar, Uttar Pradesh. It serves 10,000 passengers, making it the busiest railway station in the Ghazipur district. It is the junction where the Dildarnagar–Tarighat branch line is separated from Howrah–Delhi main line. For many years the main line of the East Indian Railway which crosses the District south of the Ganges was the only line, but a branch was subsequently made from Dildarnagar to Tarighat.

History
A branch line from Dildarnagar was constructed as a provincial state railway in year 1862. This branch with a station at Nagsar and its terminus at Tarighat was opened on the south bank of Ganga, opposite Ghazipur  from Dildarnagar.

Gallery

References

Railway stations in Ghazipur district
Railway junction stations in Uttar Pradesh
Dildarnagar
Danapur railway division